Akça is a Turkish island shaped like a shellfish near the biggest city of the Turkish Aegean coast Izmir. It is an uninhabited island and there are only bushes on the island. It is situated between Arap Islands, Yassıca Island, Çiçek Islands, Körtaş Islands and İncirli Island. It is off the coast of Port of Urla. It is a small island surrounded with turquoise waters, thus it is a swimming spot for the residents of Izmir in summertime.

The Greek name for Akça was Nisida Patates. The Southwest part of the island is a little rocky and there is a small islet called Akçaca Islet 100 m. off the coast.

Uninhabited islands of Turkey
Islands of İzmir Province
Urla District
Gulf of İzmir